KHH may refer to:

KHH, the IATA code for Kaohsiung International Airport, Siaogang District, Taiwan
KHH, the Indian Railways station code for Kichha railway station, Uttarakhand, India